The Syrian Civil Defence Forces, also known as Self-Protection Squads, is a civil defence organisation that operates in Syria. It is also known as The People's Army. Directors-General of the organisation have included Brigadier General Abdel-Chani Jamal. The forces are divided into units or squads.

The Syrian Civil Defence Forces have been part of the ICDO (International Civil Defence Organisation) from 1972 onward, when there were around 50,000 volunteers. 

They are not connected to, and should not be confused with, the White Helmets / Syria Civil Defence (SCD).

Notes 

Emergency services in Syria
Volunteer organizations
Pro-government factions of the Syrian civil war